Virginia Berresford (1902, 1904 or 1914 – 1995) was a painter, printmaker, and art gallery owner. Her works are exhibited in major galleries.

Early life and education
She was born Virginia Berresford in either 1902, 1904  or 1914 (sources vary) in New Rochelle, New York. She studied at Wellesley College in 1921, and Teachers College, Columbia University in 1923 with Charles Martin.
She studied at the Art Students League, with George Bridgman.
She studied in Paris, with Amédée Ozenfant from 1925 to 1930.

Art career
In the 1950s, she opened an art gallery in Edgartown, Martha's Vineyard.

Her work is included in the permanent collections of the Whitney Museum of American Art the Detroit Institute of Arts and the Dallas Museum of Art.

Exhibitions
Third Biennial Exhibition of Contemporary American Painting, 1936, Whitney Museum of American Art
Second Biennial Exhibition: Sculpture, Drawings and Prints, 1936, Whitney Museum of American Art
Oil Paintings by Living Artists, 1935, Brooklyn Museum
First Biennial Exhibition of Contemporary American Sculpture, Watercolors and Prints, 1933, Whitney Museum of American Art
46 Painters and Sculptors under 35 Years of Age, 1930, Museum of Modern Art, New York.

Bibliography
Virginia's journal: an autobiography of an artist, Glen Publishing Co., 1989

References

External links

1900s births
1995 deaths
20th-century American painters
20th-century American women artists
20th-century American printmakers
People from Edgartown, Massachusetts
Wellesley College alumni
Artists from New Rochelle, New York
Teachers College, Columbia University alumni
American women painters
Painters from New York (state)
American women printmakers
Art gallery owners